Grenfell Centre, also known as The Black Stump, is a high rise office building located at 25 Grenfell Street in the Adelaide city centre. It was the tallest building in the city until surpassed by the Telstra House in 1987. It has 26 floors and was completed in 1973. In the 1980s, the building's foyer and interior were refurbished. A ten-metre antenna was attached in 1980 and upgraded with digital transmitters in 2003, increasing the height a metre further.

In 2007, the building was redeveloped, and two frameless glass cubes were constructed at the entrance of the building. This redevelopment earned it the Royal Australian Institute of Architects Commercial Architecture Award of Commendation.

, Oracle uses the building; over the last few years, the company logo has been displayed at the top.

Its nickname, "black stump", in reference to the building's appearance, is also a colloquial Australian phrase.

See also 
 List of tallest buildings in Adelaide

References

Skyscrapers in Adelaide
Buildings and structures in Adelaide
Skyscraper office buildings in Australia
Office buildings completed in 1973